The 1926 Milan–San Remo was the 19th edition of the Milan–San Remo cycle race and was held on 21 March 1926. The race started in Milan and finished in San Remo. The race was won by Costante Girardengo.

General classification

References

1926
1926 in road cycling
1926 in Italian sport
March 1926 sports events